The snowy-cheeked laughingthrush (Ianthocincla sukatschewi), also known as Sukatschev's laughingthrush, is a species of bird in the family Leiothrichidae. It is endemic to northern China where its natural habitat is temperate forests. It is threatened by habitat loss.

The snowy-cheeked laughingthrush was at one time placed in the genus Garrulax but following the publication of a comprehensive molecular phylogenetic study in 2018, it was moved to the resurrected genus Ianthocincla. The specific name honours the Russian merchant, philanthropist and collector Vladimir Platonovich Sukachev (1849-1919).

References

snowy-cheeked laughingthrush
Birds of Central China
Endemic birds of China
snowy-cheeked laughingthrush
Taxonomy articles created by Polbot
Taxobox binomials not recognized by IUCN